The Integrated Cycling Federation of the Philippines (PhilCycling) is the national governing body for cycling as a sport in the Philippines. It is duly recognised by the Philippine Sports Commission and the Philippine Olympic Committee and the International Cycling Union (Union Cycliste Internationale a.k.a. UCI).

The Federation houses the four Olympic Cycling disciplines: 
 Road Cycling
 Mountain Bike Racing
 Cross Country Olympic (XCO) 
 Downhill Mountain Bike Racing (DHI)
 Track Cycling
 BMX Racing

References

External links
Integrated Cycling Federation of the Philippines profile at the Philippine Olympic Committee website

Cycling in the Philippines
Cycling
National members of the Asian Cycling Confederation